Marina Sulicich (born 18 February 1964) is an Australian gymnast. She competed in five events at the 1980 Summer Olympics.

References

1964 births
Living people
Australian female artistic gymnasts
Olympic gymnasts of Australia
Gymnasts at the 1980 Summer Olympics
Place of birth missing (living people)
20th-century Australian women